The Davidson Hospital was a health facility in Girvan, South Ayrshire, Scotland. It was managed by NHS Ayrshire and Arran. It remains a Category B listed building.

History 
The facility was financed by a gift from Thomas, James and Janet Davidson, in memory of their mother, Margaret Davidson. It was designed by Watson, Salmond and Gray and opened in 1921. It joined the National Health Service in 1948 and a new out‑patients' department was added in 1970. After services transferred to the new Girvan Community Hospital, the Davidson Hospital closed in March 2010. It was subsequently placed on the Buildings at Risk Register.

References 

Hospitals in South Ayrshire
NHS Ayrshire and Arran
Defunct hospitals in Scotland
Hospital buildings completed in 1921
Hospitals established in 1921
1921 establishments in Scotland
Girvan